Todd Strange (born ) is an American politician and businessman who served as the 56th mayor of Montgomery, Alabama. Strange won a special election and took office on March 24, 2009, after his predecessor, Democrat Bobby Bright, was elected to the United States House of Representatives. Although municipal elections in Montgomery are nonpartisan, Strange is a Republican.

Before becoming mayor, Strange served as chairman of the Montgomery County Commission for nearly five years. He also served as president, CEO, and co-owner of Blount Strange Automotive Group.

References

External links
 Official biography

1940s births
21st-century American politicians
Alabama Republicans
Living people
Mayors of Montgomery, Alabama
County commissioners in Alabama
University of Montevallo alumni